The Stadion Miejski przy Solskiego 1 w Mielcu (English: Solskiego 1 Street Municipal Stadium in Mielec) is a multi-use stadium in Mielec, Poland with a 6,849 seating capacity. It has been the home ground of Stal Mielec since its opening in 1953. It is also used by the LKS Mielec athletic club. The stadium is also known as the Stadion Stali Mielec (English: Stal Mielec Stadium) in connection with its most common host.

The stadium has hosted numerous European Champions Cup, UEFA Cup, and Poland national team matches, including FIFA World Cup and UEFA European Championship qualifiers. Most notably, the stadium hosted Real Madrid in the 1976–77 European Cup with a record attendance exceeding 40,000 spectators.

During the fall of communism in Poland, and the years of economic hardship that followed, the club's performance declined and the stadium lacked funding for maintenance and repair. The structure of the stadium gradually deteriorated until in 2007 when the Mielec City Council voted to draft the reconstruction of the stadium, and construction work followed in 2011-2013. The modernised stadium, while reduced in capacity, has already served to revitalise the club's performance with Stal Mielec advancing to the I Liga in 2016. Mielec City Council is currently looking for more sponsorship opportunities, with the possibility of leasing the naming rights of the stadium.

History

The stadium opened in November 1953 with the opening match between Stal Mielec and Garbarnia Kraków. The following year, two stands for 7,000 spectators were constructed. Along with the stands, two sports training fields, a volleyball field, basketball and tennis courts were also constructed. A race track, a high jumping area and other athletic displays emerged.

In 1973-1976, the construction of two new upper-level stands expanded the seating capacity to 30,000 spectators (Matches against Hamburg SV in the 1975–76 UEFA Cup quarter-final, Real Madrid in the 1976–77 European Cup first round and K.S.C. Lokeren in the 1982–83 UEFA Cup first round contained records of 40,000 spectators)

Stadium light towers were constructed in 1979-1980 allowing for the highest light power in the country at the time: 1800 lx. The first match with the new lighting took place on 29 October 1980 between Stal Mielec and ŁKS Łódź

Due to the undergoing economic structure in Poland as a result of the fall of communism, Stal Mielec's participation in major football competitions declined. Private sponsors stopped investments into the league and developments of the stadium, and neighbouring sports objects stopped. The structural condition of the stadium deteriorated with the upper level stands being closed off from the public.

The financial inconveniences gradually began to resolve with the formation of Stal Mielec as an independent club in 1997, the undertaking of the stadium by the Municipality of Mielec from PZL Mielec in 2001 and the vote by Mielec City Council on 6 September 2007 to draft a reconstruction project for the stadium .

Historically a flea market "Bazaar" had been functioning from 22 February 1990 on the eastern part of the stadium, opened every Thursday and Saturday up until reconstruction works began.

Modernisation 
In 2011, Mielec City Council contracted TAMEX Obiekty Sportowe S.A. to undertake the reconstruction of the stadium, costing the city 40 million PLN. The stadium capacity was reduced from 22,000 to 6,849, and divided into 18 sectors. The lighting towers, athletic and recreational areas were also renovated during the process. Reconstruction works lasted from January 2011 to August 2013.

The newly reconstructed stadium opened on 30 August 2013, with the opening match taking place the next day between FKS Stal Mielec - Wigry Suwałki.

The eastern stand houses FKS Stal Mielec and the club shop while the western stand houses LKS Mielec and a sports centre.

Poland National Team Matches
The Poland national team has played four games at the Stadion Miejski in Mielec.

References

External links

 History of the Stadion Miejski in Mielec

Mielec
Stal Mielec
Mielec
Sports venues in Podkarpackie Voivodeship